Michael Anthony Monsoor (April 5, 1981September 29, 2006) was a United States Navy SEAL who was killed during Invasion of Iraq and posthumously awarded the Medal of Honor. He enlisted in the United States Navy in 2001 and graduated from Basic Underwater Demolition/SEAL Training BUD/S class 250 in 2004. After further training he was assigned to Delta Platoon, SEAL Team 3.

Delta Platoon was sent to Iraq in April 2006 and assigned to train Iraqi Army soldiers in Ramadi. Over the next five months, Monsoor and his platoon frequently engaged in combat with insurgent forces. On September 29, 2006, an insurgent threw a grenade onto a rooftop where Monsoor and several other SEALs and Iraqi soldiers were positioned. Monsoor quickly smothered the grenade with his body, absorbing the resulting explosion and saving his comrades from serious injury or death.  Monsoor died about 30 minutes later from wounds caused by the grenade explosion.

Monsoor was posthumously awarded the Medal of Honor, which was presented by President George W. Bush to Monsoor's parents on April 8, 2008.

Early life and education
Monsoor was born April 5, 1981, in Long Beach, California, the third of four children of Sally Ann (Boyle) and George Paul Monsoor. His father also served in the United States military as a Marine. His father is of Lebanese and Irish descent, and his mother has Irish ancestry. When he was a child, Monsoor was afflicted with asthma but strengthened his lungs by racing his siblings in the family's swimming pool. He attended Dr. Walter C. Ralston Intermediate School and Garden Grove High School in Garden Grove, California and played tight-end on the school's football team, graduating in 1999.

Military career

United States Navy SEALs

Monsoor enlisted in the United States Navy on March 24, 2001, and attended Basic Training at Recruit Training Command Great Lakes, Illinois. Upon graduation from basic training, he attended Master At Arms "A" School. He entered Basic Underwater Demolition/SEAL (BUD/S) training and graduated from Class 250 on September 2, 2004, as one of the top performers in his class. After BUD/S, he completed advanced SEAL training courses including parachute training at Basic Airborne School, cold weather combat training in Kodiak, Alaska, and six months of SEAL Qualification Training in Coronado, California, graduating in March 2005. The following month, his rating changed from Quartermaster to Master-at-Arms, and he was assigned to Delta Platoon, SEAL Team 3.

Iraq War

During the Battle of Ramadi, SEAL Team Three was sent to Ramadi, Iraq in April 2006 and assigned to train Iraqi Army soldiers. As a communicator and machine-gunner on patrols, Monsoor carried  of gear in temperatures often exceeding 100 degrees. He took a lead position to protect the platoon from frontal assault and the team was frequently involved in engagements with insurgent fighters. During the first five months of deployment, that platoon from Team 3 was assigned to Camp Corregidor on the east side of Ramadi, led by then-Lieutenant Seth Stone, who also earned the Silver Star for his own actions on the same September 29, 2006 operation.

Unrelated, Chris Kyle operated on the far western side of the city in support of additional special warfare operations; he reportedly killed 84 insurgents.

During an engagement on May 9, 2006, Monsoor ran into a street while under continuous insurgent gunfire to rescue an injured comrade. Monsoor was awarded the Silver Star for this action, and was also awarded the Bronze Star Medal for his service in Iraq.

Death
On September 29, 2006, Monsoor's platoon engaged four insurgents in a firefight in Ramadi, killing one and injuring another. Anticipating further attacks, Monsoor, three SEAL snipers and three Iraqi Army soldiers took up a rooftop position. Civilians aiding the insurgents blocked off the streets, and a nearby mosque had broadcast a message for people to fight against the Americans and the Iraqi soldiers. Monsoor was protecting other SEALs, two of whom were 15 feet away from him. Monsoor's position made him the only SEAL on the rooftop with quick access to an escape route.

A grenade was thrown onto the rooftop by an insurgent on the street below. The grenade hit Monsoor in the chest and fell onto the floor. Immediately, Monsoor yelled "Grenade!" and jumped onto the grenade, covering it with his body. The grenade exploded seconds later and Monsoor's body absorbed most of the force of the blast. Monsoor was severely wounded and although evacuated immediately, he died 30 minutes later. Two other SEALs next to him at the time were injured by the explosion but survived.

Monsoor was described as a "quiet professional" and a "fun-loving guy" by those who knew him. He is buried at Fort Rosecrans National Cemetery in San Diego.

Funeral
During the funeral, as the coffin was moving from the hearse to the grave site, Navy SEALs were lined up forming a column of twos on both sides of the pallbearers' route, with the coffin moving up the center. As the coffin passed each SEAL, they slapped down the gold Trident each had removed from his own uniform and deeply embedded it into the wooden coffin.

The display moved many attending the funeral, including President Bush, who spoke about the incident later during a speech stating: "The procession went on nearly half an hour, and when it was all over, the simple wooden coffin had become a gold-plated memorial to a hero who will never be forgotten."

Awards and decorations

Medal of Honor

On March 31, 2008, the United States Department of Defense confirmed that Monsoor would posthumously receive the Medal of Honor. Monsoor's parents, Sally and George Monsoor, received the medal on his behalf at an April 8, ceremony at the White House held by the President. Monsoor became the fourth American servicemember and second Navy SEAL – each killed in the line of duty – to receive the United States' highest military award during the War on Terrorism.

Medal of Honor citation

MASTER AT ARMS SECOND CLASS, SEA, AIR and LAND
MICHAEL A. MONSOOR
UNITED STATES NAVY
For service as set forth in the following CITATION:

Silver Star citation

Bronze Star citation

Legacy
In 2011, the United States Department of Veterans Affairs honored Monsoor by naming one of the first three named streets at Miramar National Cemetery after him.

USS Michael Monsoor (DDG-1001)

Mountain Warfare Training Camp Michael Monsoor

U.S. Naval Sea Cadet Corps
There is a U.S. Naval Sea Cadet Corps unit named the "Michael A. Monsoor Battalion" based in Camp Pendleton, California. The unit symbol is composed of Petty Officer Monsoor's Medal of Honor, SEAL Trident, and Master-at-Arms shield. Everyone in the unit knows Petty Officer Michael A. Monsoor's career history and shares it with all new cadets.

Garden Grove High School Memorial Stadium
As part of modernization, Garden Grove High School, where Michael Monsoor attended, dedicated the newly built stadium to him, naming it "Michael Monsoor Memorial Stadium".

Damn Few: Making the Modern SEAL Warrior
Michael Monsoor is mentioned in the book of Rorke Denver "Damn Few: Making the Modern SEAL Warrior".

See also

List of Medal of Honor recipients

References

External links

1981 births
2006 deaths
People from Long Beach, California
People from Garden Grove, California
American people of Lebanese descent
American people of Irish descent
United States Navy sailors
United States Navy personnel of the Iraq War
United States Navy SEALs personnel
United States Navy Medal of Honor recipients
Recipients of the Silver Star
American military personnel killed in the Iraq War
Deaths by hand grenade
Burials at Fort Rosecrans National Cemetery
Iraq War recipients of the Medal of Honor